"The Spy Who Learned Me" is the twentieth episode of the twenty-third season of the American animated television series The Simpsons. It originally aired on the Fox network in the United States on May 6, 2012.

Plot
On their date night, Homer takes Marge to an action film featuring the legendary fictional spy character Stradivarius Cain (voiced by Bryan Cranston), but Homer's endless series of humorous shout-outs during the film earn him as much contempt from Marge as they do kudos from Lenny and Carl. Marge makes it clear the next morning she is still angry at Homer, and he ends up feeling sad on the job—though he soon feels much worse after Mr. Burns accidentally drives into the ladder Homer was using to fix lights and Homer ends up getting a serious concussion. Mr. Burns reluctantly agrees with the concerns of Smithers (moral) and his lawyer (legal) and gives Homer eight weeks off with pay. When Homer goes home, however, Marge's disgust with him has been matched by the discontents Bart, Lisa, and Grandpa feel about other things, so Homer decides to keep his paid leave a secret. He pretends to go to work every day and initially has a lot of fun, but soon returns to melancholy over the poor state of affairs with Marge. He is then stunned to see Cain appear to him as an imaginary friend, who will tutor Homer on how to be irresistible to Marge, starting with a lesson in confidence at a local restaurant that ends with Homer winning over the lovely wife of an angry drug lord who swears revenge. Marge learns from Lenny that Homer was out on leave, and becomes enraged at him, only for Homer to completely defuse her anger by taking Cain's advice and telling Marge the truth (that he lied about going to work, and used the time to learn to be a better husband). When they head out for a night of dancing, Montana spots them and plans to kill Homer, but Homer uses a line about lovely eyes that leads to him being forgiven. Marge then asks Homer seductively how much more leave time he has, but Homer chuckles that his paid vacation ended last week, and they just have to wait for the call from Human Resources.

Meanwhile, a new smartphone-scanning policy at Springfield Elementary brings Nelson's lunch-money shakedown to a new level and leads Bart to plan revenge. When he watches Declan Desmond's muckraking documentary Do You Want LIES With That? about the Krusty Burger's shady dealings and unethical food practices, he realizes eating nothing but Krusty's fast food will be quite bad for Nelson, and gives the bully a free coupon book that leads to Nelson becoming horrifically fat and unhealthy. Lisa then takes Nelson to show his terrible fate at Krusty's, so Krusty offers Nelson free time with his personal trainer. Nelson ends up in great shape and ready to beat up more nerds than ever, but Lisa notes "he is tough on nerds, but easy on the eyes" as Bart stares at her in disbelief.

Cultural references
The name of the episode is a pun on the James Bond film The Spy Who Loved Me
Stradivarius Cain is a take on James Bond.
Blue-eyed man is based on Tony Montana of Scarface
The plot line of Do You Want Lies with That is a parody of Morgan Spurlock’s 2004 documentary, Super Size Me.
Krusty's personal trainer name checks Hugh Jackman's work as Wolverine as a possible example of what he should aim for in getting Nelson back in shape (Krusty says he can't afford to pay to make Nelson look that good) and then asks if he should get Nelson into the same shape that Alicia Silverstone got in to play Batgirl in Batman & Robin (Krusty cruelly responds "He's that now!").

Reception
Rowan Kaiser of The A.V. Club gave the episode a B+ grade, stating, “‘The Spy Who Learned Me’ works, and works well. The way Homer annoys Marge—by making horrible jokes during a terrible movie while being egged on by Lenny and Carl—is good fun. It allows the show to do two of the things it's always been best at: horrible puns and movie parodies.”

References

External links

The Simpsons (season 23) episodes
2012 American television episodes
American spy fiction